The 1994 America East men's basketball tournament was hosted by the higher seeds in head-to-head matchups. The final was held at Daskalakis Athletic Center on the campus of Drexel University. Drexel gained its first overall America East Conference Championship and an automatic berth to the NCAA tournament with its win over Maine. Drexel was given the 14th seed in the East Regional of the NCAA Tournament and lost in the first round to Temple 61–39.

Bracket and Results

See also
America East Conference

References

America East Conference men's basketball tournament
1993–94 North Atlantic Conference men's basketball season